The St. Louis Cardinals 1983 season was a season in American baseball. It was the team's 102nd season in St. Louis, Missouri and the 92nd season in the National League. The Cardinals went 79-83 during the season and finished 4th in the National League East, eleven games behind the NL Champion Philadelphia Phillies. They were the first team in the Divisional play era to have a losing season one year after winning the World Series.

First baseman Keith Hernandez, shortstop Ozzie Smith, and outfielder Willie McGee won Gold Gloves this year, although Hernandez was traded to the New York Mets in mid-season.

Offseason 
 December 2, 1982: Julio González was released by the Cardinals.
 December 14, 1982: Bobby Meacham was traded by the St. Louis Cardinals with Stan Javier to the New York Yankees for Steve Fincher (minors), Bob Helsom (minors) and Marty Mason (minors). 
 February 16, 1983: Jamie Quirk was signed as a free agent by the Cardinals.

Regular season 
Steve Carlton won his 300th game on September 23, 1983, against his former team, the St. Louis Cardinals.

Season standings

Record vs. opponents

Opening Day starters 
 Bob Forsch
 David Green
 George Hendrick
 Keith Hernandez
 Ken Oberkfell
 Darrell Porter
 Mike Ramsey
 Lonnie Smith
 Ozzie Smith

Notable transactions 
 June 15, 1983: Keith Hernandez was traded by the Cardinals to the New York Mets for Neil Allen and Rick Ownbey.
 July 6, 1983: Jim Kaat was released by the Cardinals.
 August 2, 1983: Eric Rasmussen was purchased from the Cardinals by the Kansas City Royals.

Draft picks 
 June 6, 1983: 1983 Major League Baseball draft
Jim Lindeman was drafted by the Cardinals in the 1st round (24th pick).
Tom Pagnozzi was drafted by the Cardinals in the 8th round. Player signed June 18, 1983.

Roster

Player stats

Batting

Starters by position 
Note: Pos = Position; G = Games played; AB = At bats; H = Hits; Avg. = Batting average; HR = Home runs; RBI = Runs batted in

Other batters 
Note: G = Games played; AB = At bats; H = Hits; Avg. = Batting average; HR = Home runs; RBI = Runs batted in

Pitching

Starting pitchers 
Note: G = Games pitched; IP = Innings pitched; W = Wins; L = Losses; ERA = Earned run average; SO = Strikeouts

Other pitchers 
Note: G = Games pitched; IP = Innings pitched; W = Wins; L = Losses; ERA = Earned run average; SO = Strikeouts

Relief pitchers 
Note: G = Games pitched; W = Wins; L = Losses; SV = Saves; ERA = Earned run average; SO = Strikeouts

Farm system

References

External links
1983 St. Louis Cardinals at Baseball Reference
1983 St. Louis Cardinals at Baseball Almanac

St. Louis Cardinals seasons
Saint Louis Cardinals season
St Louis